Wotton  may refer to:

Places 

Wotton, Devon, England
Wotton, Gloucester, an area of Gloucester, Gloucestershire, England
Wotton, Surrey, England
Wotton House, Surrey, a Grade II listed building
Wotton-under-Edge, a town in the Stroud district, Gloucestershire, England
Wotton Underwood, Buckinghamshire, England
Wotton House, a Grade I listed building a country house
Wotton, Quebec, Canada

People 

David Wotton, Australian politician
Edward Wotton, English zoologist
Henry Wotton, English author and diplomat
Lex Wotton, Aboriginal Australian elder and political activist
Lou Wotton (born 1983), Australian rules footballer
Mark Wotton, Canadian ice hockey player
Nicholas Wotton, English diplomat
Paul Wotton, football player for Plymouth Argyle
Rob Wotton, sports news presenter/reporter
William Wotton, linguist, historian, and critic

Other 

Lord Henry Wotton, a character in Oscar Wilde's The Picture of Dorian Gray
Wotton (hundred), an ancient subdivision of the county of Surrey, England
Wotton Tramway
Wotton Tramway locomotives

See also
Wootton (disambiguation)